Mosonszentmiklós is a village in Győr-Moson-Sopron county, Hungary.

People 
 Iván Hécz
 István Kormos (hu)
 Artúr Nikisch
 József Samodai (hu)
 Damján György Vargha (hu)

External links 
 Street map 
 Official web page of Mosonszentmiklós  

Populated places in Győr-Moson-Sopron County